Illuminator may refer to:

 A light source
 Limner, an illustrator of manuscripts
 Illuminator radar
 The Illuminator, a political art collective based in New York City
 Illuminator (Marvel Comics), a Christian superhero appearing in American comic books by Marvel Comics

People 
Gregory the Illuminator (250s–330s)
 Euthymius the Illuminator (950s–1020s)
 Saint Sava, known as Illuminator of the Serbs (1169–1235)

See also 
 Illuminate (disambiguation)
 Illuminated (disambiguation)